The United States Department of Transportation defines a major carrier or major airline carrier as a U.S.-based airline that posts more than $1 billion in revenue during a fiscal year, grouped accordingly as "Group III".

Airlines
According to FY2022 revenues, there were 19 major carriers who meet the requirement for Group III status.

Mainline passenger
Alaska Airlines
Allegiant Air
American Airlines*
Delta Air Lines*
Frontier Airlines
Hawaiian Airlines
JetBlue
Southwest Airlines*
Spirit Airlines

United Airlines*

(*) - considered as one of the "Big 4" major U.S. national airlines

Regional passenger

Envoy Air (subsidiary of American Airlines Group)
Republic Airways
SkyWest Airlines

Freight
Atlas Air
FedEx Express
Kalitta Air
Polar Air Cargo (subsidiary of Atlas Air Worldwide Holdings)
UPS Airlines
USA Jet Airlines

See also
Largest airlines in the world
List of largest airlines in North America
List of airlines of the United States
Legacy carrier

References

Civil aviation in the United States
United States Department of Transportation